Llwynywermod, also known as Llwynywormwood, is an estate owned by the Duchy of Cornwall, just outside the Brecon Beacons National Park in Carmarthenshire, Wales. The  estate is near the village of Myddfai, Llandovery, Carmarthenshire.

History
William Williams, a relative of Anne Boleyn, was the owner in the 13th or 14th centuries. 

In 1815, George Griffies-Williams was created a baronet, and Llwynywermod became the seat of the Griffies-Williams baronets, General Sir Watkin Lewis Griffies Williams (1800–1877) was born at the family estate; he was the 3rd and last Baronet of the Griffies-Williams Baronetcy and also an officer in the British Indian Army.

In November 2006, Llwynywermod was purchased by the Duchy of Cornwall as a residence for the Duke of Cornwall in Wales. The duchy completed its purchase of the property in April 2007. King Charles III who at the time was Prince of Wales and his at the time partner (prior to marriage) Camilla Parker Bowles, (currently Queen Camilla, who in 2009 became the Duchess of Cornwall) took up residence at the property in summer 2008 before their accession.

Buildings
The three-bedroom farmhouse was converted into a residence for Charles III, by Craig Hamilton Architects using traditional building techniques. It was once the coach house to the now ruined 13-bedroom country house of the Griffies-Williams family that stood nearby. The cottages on the farm named North Range and West Range adjoin the main house and are let as holiday accommodation when His Majesty is not in residence.

See also
Highgrove House, near Tetbury, Gloucestershire, the family residence of the King and Queen Consort, owned by the Duchy of Cornwall
Kensington Palace, the official London residence of the Prince and Princess of Wales
Adelaide Cottage, in Windsor, the family residence of the Prince and Princess of Wales
Anmer Hall, part of the Sandringham estate in Norfolk, the country residence of the Prince and Princess of Wales

References

Further reading
Baker, Mark (2008). A Royal Home in Wales: Llwynywermod. Accent Press. (North Wales) .

External links
Official Llwynywermod (North Range) Duchy of Cornwall property
Official Llwynywermod (West Range) Duchy of Cornwall property
BBC NEWS: "In pictures: Charles' Welsh home"
Daily Telegraph: "Head to Wales to find a farm fit for a Prince"
This Is London: "Pictured: Inside Charles and Camilla's new eco-friendly Welsh home"
The Times: "After 37 years as Prince of Wales, Charles finally buys a home there"
BBC NEWS: "Royal History of Charles' Estate"
Sunday Times: "The Windsors' Holiday Home in Wales"

Black Mountain (hill)
Country houses in Wales
Duchy of Cornwall
Houses in the Brecon Beacons National Park
Houses in Carmarthenshire
Royal residences in the United Kingdom